Tulcea Danube Delta Airport  (also known as Cataloi Airport) is located in south-eastern Romania,  south of the city of Tulcea, on the Danube bank and close to the Danube Delta. It is Northern Dobruja's second airport after Mihail Kogălniceanu International Airport, which serves  Constanța.

Airlines and destinations
Romanian flag carrier TAROM flew between its hub Henri Coanda International Airport and Tulcea in June 2008 but the route was soon cancelled due to poor ticket sales. Since Fly Romania's departure in August 2014, there have been no scheduled flights to and from the airport. This will change in June 2023, when HiSky started full charter services from Tulcea to Antalya and therefore marked the resumption of schedule flights.

Statistics

See also
Aviation in Romania
Transport in Romania

References

External links
 
 Google Map - Aerial View

Airports in Romania
Buildings and structures in Tulcea County
Airports established in 1952